Live at Oak Mountain is a live DVD concert of the band, Widespread Panic, filmed at Oak Mountain Amphitheater in Pelham, Alabama on August 12, 2000.

Personnel

Widespread Panic
John Bell – Vocals, Guitar
John "JoJo" Hermann – Keyboards, Vocals
Michael Houser – Guitar
Todd Nance – Drums, Vocals
Domingo S. Ortiz – Percussion, Vocals
Dave Schools – Bass, Vocals

Widespread Panic video albums
2001 live albums
2001 video albums
Live video albums